The Entiat (Sintia'tkumuk, Sintiatqkumuhs, Inti-etook, Intietooks) are a Native American tribe who exclusively used and occupied an area extending from the Columbia River to the Cascade Mountains along the drainage system of the Entiat River.

Ethnography
The Entiat are members of the Confederated Tribes of the Colville Reservation, a federally recognized tribe. It is located on the Colville Indian Reservation in eastern Washington state.  The Confederated Tribes have over 9,000 descendants from 12 aboriginal tribes. In addition to the Entiat, the tribes are known in English as the Colville, the Nespelem, the Sanpoil, the Lake (Sinixt), the Palus, the Wenatchi, the Chelan, the Methow, the southern Okanagan, the Sinkiuse-Columbia, and the Nez Perce of Chief Joseph's Band.

The Entiat speak English.  The native language of the tribe is a Salishan language made up of several different dialects among the tribes.
 
The Entiat enrollment as of September 24, 1954 lists 113 Entiat.

Notes

Further reading

 Hackenmiller, Tom. Wapato Heritage: The History of the Chelan and Entiat Indians. Manson, WA (P.O. Box 355, Manson 98831): Point Pub, 1995.

Interior Salish
Native American tribes in Washington (state)